Scribonius Aphrodisius was a grammarian of ancient Rome. He was originally a slave and disciple of the grammarian Lucius Orbilius Pupillus, who was also the teacher of the Roman poet Horace. He was purchased by Scribonia, the second wife of the emperor Augustus, and was by her manumitted. She may have purchased him to educate her children, or possibly herself.

Aphrodisius is known to have written a treatise on orthography, in opposition to a similar work written by the grammarian Verrius Flaccus, also a freedman, but this work is now lost.

Notes

Imperial Roman slaves and freedmen
Grammarians of Latin
Latin writers known only from secondary sources
Scribonii
1st-century Romans
1st-century BC Romans